The Afghanistan cricket team toured Zimbabwe in June 2022 to play three One Day International (ODI) matches and three Twenty20 International (T20I) matches. The ODI series formed part of the inaugural 2020–2023 ICC Cricket World Cup Super League. In April 2022, Zimbabwe Cricket confirmed the fixtures for the tour. The following month, the tour itinerary was changed slightly, bringing the matches forward by one week and reducing the number of T20Is from five to three.

Afghanistan won the opening ODI match by 60 runs. Afghanistan also won the second ODI, with an unbeaten century from Ibrahim Zadran, to take an unassailable lead in the three-match series. Afghanistan won the third and final ODI by four wickets to win the series 3–0. In the T20I series, Afghanistan won the first match by six wickets. Afghanistan won the second T20I match by 21 runs to all win the series with a match to spare. Afghanistan won the final match of the tour by 35 runs to also win the T20I series 3–0.

Background
Afghanistan were originally scheduled to tour Zimbabwe in July and August 2020 to play five Twenty20 International (T20I) matches, subject to lockdown restrictions being lifted due to the COVID-19 pandemic. The tour was not part of the Future Tours Programme. In June 2020, the Zimbabwe cricket team resumed their training, after passing COVID-19 tests. On 20 July 2020, Zimbabwe Cricket (ZC) requested clearance from the government for the tour to go ahead, with a spokesperson from ZC stating that Afghanistan were still committed to touring. However, on 8 August 2020, the tour was called off, following an increase of COVID-19 cases in Zimbabwe.

A revised tour was scheduled to take place in February 2022. However, in January 2022, both cricket boards agreed to postpone the tour after Zimbabwe Cricket could not secure all the broadcasting services including the Decision Review System. Despite the second postponement, both cricket boards were working to reschedule the matches as soon as possible. In April 2022, the rescheduled dates for the tour were confirmed.

Squads

Afghanistan also named Noor Ahmad and Nijat Masood as reserves in their ODI squad, and Zahir Khan and Sayed Shirzad as reserves in their T20I squad.

Warm-up match

ODI series

1st ODI

2nd ODI

3rd ODI

T20I series

1st T20I

2nd T20I

3rd T20I

References

External links
 Series home at ESPN Cricinfo

2020 in Afghan cricket
2022 in Afghan cricket
2020 in Zimbabwean cricket
2022 in Zimbabwean cricket
International cricket competitions in 2022
Afghan cricket tours of Zimbabwe
Cricket events postponed due to the COVID-19 pandemic